Brigid Makowski (née Sheils) was a former member of Shannon Town Commission and Clare County Council. She was elected initially representing the Irish Republican Socialist Party (IRSP) of which she was a founding member.

She was born 6 January 1937 in the Bogside area of Derry, and was involved in the 1968 civil rights march in the city at the beginning of the Troubles. She married Leo Makowski a Polish-American whom she met when his U.S. Navy ship U.S.S Johnson docked in Derry in August 1954. They had two dates before Leo's ship left. They corresponded and he eventually proposed, she accepted, sailed to Philadelphia and they married there 16 April 1955.

She joined the Irish American grouping Clann na Gael in Philadelphia, and proposed that a Northern Ireland Civil Rights Association banner be included in the 1969 Saint Patrick's Day parade. Originally she was a member of Sinn Féin and sided with the Official wing during the 1970 split.

She disagreed however with the 1972 ceasefire and was a supporter of Seamus Costello. She was called to testify at the Official Irish Republican Army court-martial of Costello in Mornington. She remarked after Costello had been dismissed that "Jesus could have testified on Costello's behalf and it wouldn't have changed the verdict." After Costello's expulsion from Official Sinn Féin and the Official IRA, she helped set up the IRSP. She was elected in 1981 as a councillor to the Shannon Town Commission.

She was re-elected as an Independent after leaving the IRSP. She was later elected to Clare County Council in 1991. Makowski campaigned against the building of the visitor centre in Mullaghmore, in the Burren.

In 1992, she was present at the funeral of the Irish People's Liberation Organisation and Republican Socialist Collective leader Jimmy Brown. Her daughter, Stella Makowski, gave the traditional graveside speech.

On 15 April 2017, Brigid died at Letterkenny Hospital, County Donegal, Ireland from complications following treatment for lung cancer.

References

1937 births
Independent politicians in Ireland
Irish Republican Socialist Party politicians
Local councillors in County Clare
Politicians from Derry (city)
2017 deaths